The 1950 Bulgarian Cup was the 10th season of the Bulgarian Cup (in this period the tournament was named Cup of the Soviet Army). Levski Sofia won the competition after three games in the final against CSKA Sofia.

First round

|-
!colspan="3" style="background-color:#D0F0C0; text-align:left;" |Replay

|}

Quarter-finals

|}

Semi-finals

|-
!colspan="3" style="background-color:#D0F0C0; text-align:left;" |Replay

|}

Final

First game

Second game

Third game

References

1950
1949–50 domestic association football cups
Cup